The National Aeronautics and Space Administration (NASA) Historical Advisory Committee was established in 1964.

History
The NASA Historical Office was established under its first chief historian, Dr. Eugene Emme in 1960. The committee was first made up of a wide variety of members, who initially sought to find support and prestige for the new historical program. From 1969 to 1970, the committee began to be increasingly composed of professional historians from universities, who made known their dissatisfaction with the NASA historical program. As a result, the Historical Advisory Committee was reduced in size and reorganized to be composed of only university-based professional historians to oversee the work of the NASA Historical Office.

Chairmen
 Wood Gray, 1964-1966
 Melvin Kranzeberg, 1966-1970
 Louis Morton, 1970-
 Walter Rundell

Members
 Daniel J. Boorstin
 David Bushnell
 James L. Cate, 1964- 
 A. Hunter Dupree
 I. B. Holley
 Thomas P. Hughes
 Elting E. Morison, 1972-
 Robert P. Multhauf
 Rodman W. Paul
 Robert L. Perry
 John B. Rae

Sources
 Rodman W. Paul, "Historical Advisory Committees: NASA and the National Archives," Pacific Historical Review, vol. 44, no. 3 (August 1975), pp. 385–394.

History organizations based in the United States
Historians of technology
Historians of aviation
Historians of the United States